Natica perlineata is a species of predatory sea snail, a marine gastropod mollusk in the family Naticidae, the moon snails.

Distribution

Description
The maximum recorded shell length is 18.5 mm.

Habitat
Minimum recorded depth is 69 m. Maximum recorded depth is 419 m.

References

Naticidae
Gastropods described in 1889